Fusarubin is a naphthoquinone-antibiotic which is produced by the fungi Fusarium solani. Fusarubin has the molecular formula C15H14O7.

References

Further reading 

 

Antibiotics
Naphthoquinones
Methoxy compounds